The English Theatre of Hamburg is a professional theatre in Hamburg, Germany where performances are held in the English language. This private theatre was founded in 1976 by two Americans. It is the oldest professional English language theatre in Germany.

History of the Theatre  
The theatre was founded in 1976 by two Americans, Robert Rumpf and Clifford Dean who trained and worked professionally in the United States before coming to Hamburg in the mid-1970s. Together with associate director Paul Glaser they share the general management responsibilities, plan the artistic program and have directed most of the productions of the theatre. Recently they have invited guest directors.
All actors are professional trained actors directly from London.

The company presented plays in many different locations in Hamburg until 1979 when a temporary home was found in Hamburg-Altona. Since 1981, "The English Theatre of Hamburg" has had its headquarters in Lerchenfeld 14 in Mundsburg. The building was formerly the "Hammonia Bad", with medicinal baths, and is a listed building since 19. November 1971.

References

External links 
 (en) Official Website of the English Theatre

Theatres in Hamburg
Buildings and structures in Hamburg-Nord
Theatres completed in 1976
1976 establishments in West Germany
Tourist attractions in Hamburg
Minority-language theatre